In mathematics, specifically in functional analysis, a family  of subsets a topological vector space (TVS)  is said to be saturated if  contains a non-empty subset of  and if for every  the following conditions all hold:
 for every scalar   contains ;
 the closed convex balanced hull of  belongs to

Definitions

it is  if the linear span of this set is a dense subset of

Examples

The intersection of an arbitrary family of saturated families is a saturated family.

The set of all bounded subsets of a topological vector space is a saturated family.

See also

References

  
  
  

Functional analysis